DXMY (90.9 FM) RMN Cotabato is a radio station owned and operated by the Radio Mindanao Network. The station's studio is located along Esteros Hi-way, Brgy. Rosary Heights 10, Cotabato City, and its transmitter is located at No. 20 Cando St., Brgy. Tamontaka II, Cotabato City.

The station went off the air on November 5, 2020, due to the technical upgrades and the relocation of its transmitter from Rosary Heights 10 to Tamontaka II. On May 31, 2021, DXMY went back on air, this time on 90.9 FM under the name RMN iFM Cotabato.

References

Radio stations in Cotabato City
Radio stations established in 1971
News and talk radio stations in the Philippines

tl:DXMY